Oak Hill is an unincorporated community and census-designated place in Manistee County, Michigan, United States. Its population was 569 as of the 2010 census.

Geography

Demographics

References

Unincorporated communities in Manistee County, Michigan
Unincorporated communities in Michigan
Census-designated places in Manistee County, Michigan
Census-designated places in Michigan